Petrophila albulalis is a moth in the family Crambidae. It was described by George Hampson in 1906. It is found on Jamaica and Cuba.

References

Petrophila
Moths described in 1906